Green Pastures Hospital (GPH) (हरियोखर्क अस्पताल तथा पुर्नार्स्थापना केन्द्र) is located in Pokhara, Gandaki Province, Nepal. It was established in 1957. GPH provides treatment and rehabilitation for people living with spinal cord injuries and other physical disabilities, as well as reconstructive surgery, palliative care and specialist ear care.

GPH is well known for serving people affected by leprosy and disability in western Nepal for more than 60 years, most of them extremely poor and marginalised. It describes its mission as “To become a Centre of Excellence in the Care and Prevention of Disability by providing Holistic Care to transform lives.” It was established as a specialist leprosy hospital and the only tertiary rehabilitation centre for Gandaki Province. 

GPH is registered with the Nepal Government's Ministry of Health and Population as a 100-bed hospital and rehabilitation centre.

Annually, GPH serves about 11,000 patients and remains the biggest leprosy and rehabilitation hospital in Nepal's western region. It remains the hub for referrals from other INF centres, as well as hospitals and local partner organisations across western Nepal.

History 
International Nepal Fellowship (INF) started a "Green Pastures" Leprosarium in 1957 in a small farm on the South of Pokhara (opposite to where Western Regional Hospital is located) to take care of patients with Leprosy. The Leprosarium was developed into Leprosy Hospital in 1970.

References

External links 

Hospitals established in 1957
Hospitals in Pokhara
Rehabilitation hospitals
Leprosy in Nepal
1957 establishments in Nepal